Egidio Gennari (20 April 1876–8 April 1942) was an Italian communist politician who was among the founders of Italian Communist Party. He served at the Italian Parliament between 1924 and 1926 when he was forced to leave Italy due to the repression of the Fascist government. He died in exile in the Soviet Union.

Biography
Gennari was born in Albano Laziale on 20 April 1876. He was a teacher by profession. He joined the Italian Socialist Party in 1897 and headed its left wing. He adopted an internationalist approach during World War I. He served as the political secretary of the Italian Socialist Party in 1920 replacing Nicola Bombacci in the post. He was a vice chairman of Presidium of the Third World Congress of the Comintern. He also participated in several plenums of the Communist International or Comintern in the 1920s. His pseudonym in these meetings was Maggi.

In 1921 Gennari cofounded the Italian Communist Party. In 1923 the party leader Amadeo Bordiga was arrested, and the Comintern Executive Committee assigned a group of party members to lead the party, including Gennari, Mauro Scoccimarro, Palmiro Togliatti, Angelo Tasca and Umberto Terracini. In the party Gennari was part of the faction led by Antonio Gramsci. Gennari was elected as a deputy in 1924. In 1926 he settled in the Soviet Union when the Fascist repression intensified. Gennari represented the Italian Communist Party in an international conference organized against war and fascism held in Paris on 23 and 24 November 1935 shortly after the invasion of Abyssinia by the Italian Fascist forces. He died in Gorky, Russia, on 8 April 1942.

References

External links

1876 births
1942 deaths
Italian anti-fascists
Italian Socialist Party politicians
Italian Communist Party politicians
Politicians from Rome
Exiled Italian politicians
Italian political party founders
Italian Comintern people
Deputies of Legislature XXVI of the Kingdom of Italy
Italian emigrants to the Soviet Union